The first cabinet of Kaj Leo Johannesen was the government of the Faroe Islands in the period 26 September 2008 until 14 November 2011. Kaj Leo Johannesen from the Union Party (Sambandsflokkurin) was prime minister, the other parties of the cabinet were the People's Party (Fólkaflokkurin) and the Social Democratic Party (Javnaðarflokkurin). On 6 April 2011 however the prime minister ended the coalition with the People's Party, who left the government after disagreements about the financial politics, and the two remaining parties formed the first minority government in the Faroese history.

On 4 May 2011 the government was reorganized, the prime minister took responsibility for the foreign affairs, the Foreign Ministry was closed, the minister of industry took over the fisheries affairs, the health minister took over internal affairs, except for affairs regarding the municipalities, and the minister of cultural affairs took over affairs regarding the municipalities.

See also 
Cabinet of the Faroe Islands

References 

Cabinets of the Faroe Islands
2008 in the Faroe Islands
2009 in the Faroe Islands
2010 in the Faroe Islands
2011 in the Faroe Islands